Christos Zechouritis, also spelled Khristos Zekhouritis, was a Greek track and field athlete who competed in the 1904 Summer Olympics in the marathon. He finished eleventh of the fifteen finishers, but moved up to tenth after Frederick Lorz was disqualified.

See also 
 Greece at the 1904 Summer Olympics

References

Sources

External links

Greek male marathon runners
Olympic athletes of Greece
Athletes (track and field) at the 1904 Summer Olympics
Year of birth missing
Year of death missing